Cocamide is a mixture of amides manufactured from the fatty acids obtained from coconut oil. As coconut oil contains about 50% of lauric acid, in formulas only the 12-carbon chains tend to be considered.

Cocamide is the structural basis of many surfactants. Common are ethanolamines (cocamide MEA, cocamide DEA), betaine compounds (cocamidopropyl betaine), and hydroxysultaines (cocamidopropyl hydroxysultaine).

References

Fatty acid amides